Arua Airport  is a civilian airport serving the city of Arua in the Northern Region of Uganda. , it is one of the 47 airports in the country.

Location
The coordinates of Arua Airport are: 03°02'50.0"N, 30°54'44.0"E (Latitude:3.047222; Longitude:30.912222).

Overview
Arua Airport's strategic location makes Arua Airport an important center for passenger and cargo air traffic between Uganda and its two neighbors, the DRC and South Sudan. It the second-busiest airport in Uganda, after Entebbe International Airport.

Airlines and destinations

Planned improvements
In July 2009, the Civil Aviation Authority of Uganda, which owns and operates Arua Airport, publicly announced that it had started to upgrade the airport to international standards. However, these plans have stalled since 2009 because of a compensation dispute with local landowners.

These improvements are part of efforts to improve Arua Airport, Gulu Airport, and Kasese Airport to international standards. When these improvements are complete, Uganda will have four international airports, including the only preexisting international airport at Entebbe.

Arua Airport is one of twelve upcountry airports administered by the Uganda Civil Aviation Authority. It is also one of five upcountry airports authorized to handle cross-border air traffic from neighboring countries to promote tourism within Eastern Africa.

See also

 Transport in Uganda
 List of airports in Uganda

References

External links
 Uganda Civil Aviation Authority
 Eagle Air Uganda
 
 
 OpenStreetMap - Arua

Airports in Uganda
Arua
Arua District
West Nile sub-region
Northern Region, Uganda
 Transport in Uganda